Kommando Nowotny was a Luftwaffe fighter Gruppe formed during the last months of World War II for testing and establishing tactics for the Messerschmitt Me 262 jet fighter, and was created and first commanded by Walter Nowotny, from whom it drew its name.

Formation

Kommando Nowotny (Kdo. Nowotny—Commando Nowotny) was formed on 26 September 1944 following the disestablishment of the earlier Erprobungskommando 262 test unit at Lechfeld Airfield, sometimes also referred to as Kommondo Thierfelder which was named after its former commander Hauptmann Werner Thierfelder. Operational status was reached on 3 October at Achmer Airfield and Hesepe. The Stab (headquarters unit) of Kommando Nowotny was created from the Stab of III. Gruppe (3rd group) of Zerstörergeschwader 26 (ZG 26—26th Destroyer Wing). At first, III. Gruppe of ZG 26 was renamed to III. Gruppe of Jagdgeschwader 6 (JG 6—6th Fighter Wing). During this transition, 8. and 9. Staffeln (squadrons) of ZG 26 became 9. and 10. Staffel of JG 6. On 16 October, III. Gruppe was detached from JG 6 and was renamed to Kommando Nowotny.

In consequence, the Stab of III. Gruppe of JG 6 became the Stab of Kdo. Nowotny while 9. and 10. Staffel of JG 6 repectively became 1. and 2. Staffel of Kdo. Nowotny. On 5 November, the creation of a 3rd Staffel was ordered, to be completed by 30 November. The creation of a 4th Staffel was ordered on 12 November but never implemented. The objective of Kdo. Nowotny was to evaluate and establish tactics for the newly developed Messerschmitt Me 262 jet fighter. General der Jagdflieger (General of the Fighter Force) Adolf Galland had hoped that the Me 262 would compensate for the United States Army Air Forces (USAAF) numerical superiority. The units first commander and namesake was Major Walter Nowotny who had previously commanded I. Gruppe of Jagdgeschwader 54 (JG 54—54th Fighter Wing) on the Eastern Front and the training unit Jagdgeschwader 101 (JG 101—101st Fighter Wing).

Operational history
After Nowotny took command of the Kommando, he submitted a demand for staff, requesting many former JG 54 pilots as possible. He replaced Oberleutnant Hans-Günter Müller, the commanding officer of the Staffel based at Hesepe, with Oberleutnant Alfred Teumer. Teumer received some training on the Me 262 at Rechlin. On 4 October, Teumer flew from Rechlin to Hesepe. During the landing approach, Teumer's aircraft suffered engine failure killing him in the resulting crash.

Following Nowotny's death on 8 November, the Kommando was withdrawn from combat operations and its pilots sent to Ergänzungs-Jagdgeschwader 2, a replacement training unit at Lechfeld Airfield, for further training. Jagdgeschwader 7 "Nowotny" (JG 7—7th Fighter Wing) "Nowotny" was then formed and placed under the command of Oberst Johannes Steinhoff. On 19 November, remnants of Kommando Nowotny was redesignated at Lechfeld Airfield to III. Gruppe of JG 7 and ordered to Brandenburg-Briest where they joined the Stab of JG 7. In consequence, the 1., 2. and 3. Staffel of Kdo. Nowotny became the 9., 10, and 11. Staffel of III. Gruppe of JG 7 which Steinhoff had placed under the command of Major Erich Hohagen. On 24 November, Kommando Nowotny was officially disbanded and ceased to exist as an independent unit. Due to the experimental nature of the unit, and the technical difficulties in operating the jet fighters, the unit had a less than illustrious record. In the time from 4 October to 24 November, a total of 24 enemy aircraft were claimed shot down for a loss of 28 Me 262s either damaged or destroyed.

Losses

Commanding officers

Gruppenkommandeure

Staffelkapitäne

1. Staffel of Kommando Nowotny

2. Staffel of Kommando Nowotny

3. Staffel of Kommando Nowotny

Notes

References

Citations

Bibliography

 
 
 
 
 
 

Luftwaffe Special Commands
Military units and formations established in 1944
Military units and formations disestablished in 1944